Richard Twining (1749–1824) was an English merchant, a director of the East India Company, and the head of Twinings the tea merchants in the Strand, London.

Life
Richard Twining was one of three sons of Daniel Twining; his mother was Mary Twining, née Little, Daniel's second wife. Richard was born at Devereux Court in 1749, and educated at Eton College. He entered the Twinings tea business at the age of fourteen with his mother after the death of his father in 1762, and succeeded to sole management in 1782 (joined later by his brother John). He participated in the major development of the tea trade caused by the operation of Commutation Act in 1784–6, during the drafting of which William Pitt the Younger repeatedly consulted him.
 
In 1793 Twining was elected a director of the East India Company. He had published three papers of Remarks on the tea trade of the company, and one of his first acts was to carry a self-denying motion prohibiting directors from trading with India; he took a prominent part in the affairs of the court until his resignation in 1816 in consequence of poor health.

Twining was a traveller, and his tours on the continent and in England formed the subject of journals and letters to his half-brother Thomas, extracts from which were published by his grandson Richard Twining in 1887, as Selections from Papers of the Twining Family. He died on 23 April 1824.

Family

By his marriage, in 1771, to Mary Aldred of Norwich, Twining had six sons and four daughters. The eldest son, Richard Twining (1772–1857), born on 5 May 1772 at Devereux Court, Strand, was educated under Samuel Parr at Norwich grammar school, and in 1794 entered the tea business, where he worked until within five weeks of his death on 14 October 1857. He was appointed chairman of the committee of by-laws at East India House, and, carrying on the scholarly habits of his father and uncle, was an old member of the Society of Arts and a Fellow of the Royal Society. By his marriage to Elizabeth Mary, daughter of the Rev. John Smythies, on 5 May 1802, he had nine children, of whom the eldest son, Richard, succeeded to the business, and edited his grandfather's and granduncle's correspondence.

References

Attribution

1749 births
1824 deaths
People educated at Eton College
English merchants
Directors of the British East India Company
Richard
Businesspeople in tea